{|
{{Infobox ship image
| Ship image = File:2015.12.31. 김천함 서울함 전역식 (24119339055).jpg
| Ship caption = ROKS Seouls decommissioning ceremony on 31 December 2015
}}

|}ROKS Seoul (FF-952)''' is the second ship of the Ulsan-class frigate in the Republic of Korea Navy. She is named after the city, Seoul.

 Development 

In the early 1990s, the Korean government plan for the construction of next generation coastal ships named Frigate 2000 was scrapped due to the 1997 Asian financial crisis. But the decommissioning of the  destroyers and the aging fleet of Ulsan-class frigates, the plan was revived as the Future Frigate eXperimental, also known as FFX in the early 2000s. 

10 ships were launched and commissioned from 1980 to 1993. They have 3 different variants which consists of Flight I, Flight II and Flight III.

 Construction and career 
ROKS Seoul'' was launched on 24 April 1984 by Hyundai Heavy Industries and commissioned on 14 December 1985.

She was decommissioned on 31 December 2015 and moored at Seoul Battleship Park, in her namesake city as a museum ship.

References

External links

1984 ships
Ulsan-class frigates
Frigates of the Republic of Korea Navy
Museum ships in South Korea
Ships built by Hyundai Heavy Industries Group